Boronia juncea is a plant in the citrus family, Rutaceae and is endemic to the far south-west of Western Australia. It is an erect shrub with linear, short-lived leaves and groups of up to eight white to pink, four-petalled flowers.

Description
The eight stamens are hairless. Flowering occurs from October to December or from January to April.

Taxonomy and naming
Boronia juncea was first formally described in 1845 by Friedrich Gottlieb Bartling and the description was published in Plantae Preissianae. The specific epithet (juncea) is a Latin word meaning "of rushes".

There are four subspecies intergrading with each other:
 Boronia juncea subsp. juncea has hairless pedicels and sepals;

Distribution and habitat
Boronia juncea grows in winter-wet areas. Subspecies juncea is found between Bunbury and Mandurah, subspecies laniflora and micrantha between Mount Melville and Mount Elphinstone in Albany, and subspecies minima between Margaret River, Augusta and Northcliffe.

Conservation
Boronia juncea is classified as "not threatened" by the Western Australian Government Department of Parks and Wildlife.

References

juncea
Flora of Western Australia
Plants described in 1845
Taxa named by Friedrich Gottlieb Bartling